The Temperance River is a  river in northern Minnesota. It drains into Lake Superior along its north shore just south of Tofte. It flows out of Brule Lake in Cook County generally south towards its mouth within Temperance River State Park. Its name is supposedly a pun on its lack of a sand bar.

Geography
The Temperance River flows  between its source, Brule Lake, and its mouth. Brule Lake is unusual in that it has two outlets. The Temperance flows from its western outlet, and carries approximately half of the flow leaving the lake, while the South Brule River carries the other half from its eastern outlet. After leaving Brule Lake, the Temperance flows through a chain of smaller lakes for the upper half of its length. It shares this feature with its neighbors, the Cross, Poplar, and Cascade rivers, which gives it a warmer water temperature and more steady flow than streams further to the south. After this, it proceeds to flow directly over the bedrock which is entirely igneous, formed during the formation of the Keweenawan Rift. Near Lake Superior, the river has dug deep potholes into the bedrock, some of which connected to form a narrow gorge and a system of waterfalls. The depth of the water where the river enters the lake prevents the river from developing a sand bar at its mouth.

History

The Temperance River was named Kawimbash by the Ojibwa, meaning "deep hollow river". While it retained this name in the earliest geological surveys, Thomas Clark reported its present name in 1864, which he alleged arose as a pun from the fact that the river has no sand bar near its mouth. However, this is not the only river on Lake Superior to have this feature, which has cast some doubt on that story.

The Temperance River is located within the Superior National Forest, and its upper portions are within the Boundary Waters Canoe Area Wilderness, thus it remains largely undeveloped. The only two major developments in the immediate vicinity of the river are Minnesota State Highway 61 and Temperance River State Park. Highway 61 was built by Minnesota's state highway department beginning in 1926, and was completely paved by 1940. During this time the highway department acquired  of land at the mouth of the river where Highway 61 crosses it, which in 1957 were organized into the present state park. The Superior Hiking Trail, which crosses the Temperance River, does so in this park.

The flow of the Temperance is not currently regulated, but during the early 20th century, dams on Brule Lake, used in conjunction with some limited logging in the region of the Brule River, have modified how much water escapes into either river. In 1925, a  canal was blasted between Brule Lake and the South Brule River, while a dam was built to close off its outlet into the Temperance, all without the permission of Minnesota's Game and Fish Department. These were later repaired, using nearby boulders, brush, and two bags of cement. During the 1920s, Edward Wellington Backus was attempting to build hydroelectric dams on northern Minnesotan rivers, and the blasting was likely connected to this development. It has been variously blamed on land speculators trying to convince buyers that the Brule had enough flow to be a viable source of hydroelectric power, or upon employees of a local development company working towards the same purpose.

See also
List of rivers of Minnesota
List of longest streams of Minnesota

References

Rivers of Minnesota
Superior National Forest
Tributaries of Lake Superior
Rivers of Cook County, Minnesota
Northern Minnesota trout streams